Tricholita signata, the signate Quaker, is a moth in the family Noctuidae described by Francis Walker in 1860. It is found in North America.

The MONA or Hodges number for Tricholita signata is 10627.

References

Further reading
 
Lafontaine, J. Donald & Schmidt, B. Christian (2010). "Annotated check list of the Noctuoidea (Insecta, Lepidoptera) of North America north of Mexico". ZooKeys. vol. 40, 1-239.

External links
Butterflies and Moths of North America

Noctuinae